Leucobrotula adipata is a species of false brotula found in the northeastern Atlantic Ocean.  This species grows to a length of  NG.  This species is the only known member of its genus.

References
 

Monotypic fish genera
Parabrotulidae
Fish described in 1952